Gregory Penske is the chairman/CEO of Penske Motor Group, which owns and operates Toyota, Lexus, and Mercedes-Benz dealerships in California and a Toyota dealership in Texas.  His father is a race car team owner and entrepreneur Roger Penske.

Early life
Penske attended the Episcopal Academy in Philadelphia and graduated from Cornell University in 1984, where he earned a degree in business management. Penske also attended General Motors Institute (now Kettering University) and worked at a Chevrolet and a Cadillac-Oldsmobile dealership while in college.

Career
Penske is the former president and CEO of Penske Motorsports, Inc., which operated racetracks across the country, including the development of the Auto Club Speedway (formerly California Speedway) in Fontana, California. He serves on the Board of Directors for Penske Corporation (holding company for Penske Automotive Group, Penske Motor Group, Penske Truck Leasing, and Team Penske), Southern California Toyota Dealership Advertising Association, Friends of Golf, Petersen Automotive Museum, and is an advisor to Nucleus Scientific Inc. He is a member of the Toyota Parts and Service Advisory Council, the Toyota President's Cabinet and the Toyota Board of Governors, and the Lexus League of Elite Dealers.

He has been named one of the highest-rated CEOs among small and medium companies by Glassdoor, a jobs and career site, which released its annual report recognizing top leaders in companies in 2015 throughout North America and Europe. "Glassdoor’s Highest Rated CEOs 2015"; Glassdoor published June 9, 2015.

Penske is a former member of the Board of Directors of the Alltel Corporation, Ares Capital Corporation, International Speedway Corporation, Los Angeles Sports Council, the Southern California Committee for the Olympic Games, and the Board of Trustees of the John Thomas Dye School.

Penske Motor Group

Penske became the new car sales manager at Longo Toyota, Penske Motor Group's flagship dealership, in 1988 and today is Chairman and CEO of the organization.  Headquartered in El Monte, California, Penske Motor Group currently operates five dealerships in California and Texas and is a division of Penske Corporation.

Awards
Penske received the Young Leadership and Excellence Award from the Automotive Hall of Fame in 1997.

References

Press release naming Gregory Penske to board of directors to ALLTEL, Retrieved January 10, 2007
 Kara Glover; "Steering for success"; published July 1, 1996; Los Angeles Business Journal; Retrieved January 10, 2007
Terry Blount; "The drive behind Penske? Passion"; ESPN published May 22, 2009 
Brant James; "Roger Penske would like to rule forever, but who will eventually be the next Captain?"; AUTOWEEK published February 27, 2013

External links
Penske Automotive Group Inc.

American automobile salespeople
American retail chief executives
Businesspeople from Philadelphia
Cornell University alumni
Kettering University alumni
Living people
Penske Corporation
People from El Monte, California
Year of birth missing (living people)
American people of German descent